This is a list of Nashville Predators award winners.

League awards

Team trophies

Individual awards

All-Stars

NHL first and second team All-Stars
The NHL first and second team All-Stars are the top players at each position as voted on by the Professional Hockey Writers' Association.

NHL All-Rookie Team
The NHL All-Rookie Team consists of the top rookies at each position as voted on by the Professional Hockey Writers' Association.

All-Star Game selections
The National Hockey League All-Star Game is a mid-season exhibition game held annually between many of the top players of each season. Sixteen All-Star Games have been held since the Nashville Predators entered the league in 1998, with at least one player chosen to represent the Predators in eleven of the games. The All-Star game has not been held in various years: 1979 and 1987 due to the 1979 Challenge Cup and Rendez-vous '87 series between the NHL and the Soviet national team, respectively, 1995, 2005, and 2013 as a result of labor stoppages, 2006, 2010, and 2014 because of the Winter Olympic Games, and 2021 as a result of the COVID-19 pandemic. Nashville has hosted one of the games. The 61st was held at Bridgestone Arena.

 Selected by fan vote

Career achievements

Hockey Hall of Fame
The following is a list of Nashville Predators who have been enshrined in the Hockey Hall of Fame.

Lester Patrick Trophy
The Lester Patrick Trophy has been presented by the National Hockey League and USA Hockey since 1966 to honor a recipient's contribution to ice hockey in the United States. This list includes all personnel who have ever been employed by the Nashville Predators in any capacity and have also received the Lester Patrick Trophy.

United States Hockey Hall of Fame

Retired numbers

The Nashville Predators have retired one of their jersey numbers. Also out of circulation is the number 99 which was retired league-wide for Wayne Gretzky on February 6, 2000. Gretzky did not play for the Predators during his 20-year NHL career and no Predators player had ever worn the number 99 prior to its retirement.

See also
List of National Hockey League awards

References

Nashville Predators
award